Félix Alberto Gallardo Mendoza (28 November 1940 – 19 January 2001) was a Peruvian football player and manager.

Career
During his club career, Gallardo played for Sporting Cristal, A.C. Milan, Cagliari Calcio and Sociedade Esportiva Palmeiras. He earned 37 caps and scored 11 goals for the Peru national football team from 1963 to 1972, and played in the 1970 FIFA World Cup, where he scored 2 goals. He was also part of Peru's squad at the 1960 Summer Olympics.

After retiring as a player, Gallardo went on to become a manager, serving as head coach of Bolognesi and Sporting Cristal.

Honours

Individual awards

Peruvian League: Top Scorer 1961, 1962.

Participation in the World Cup

Notes

References

External links
 
 Alberto Gallardo  at Peru.com

1940 births
2001 deaths
Footballers from Lima
Association football wingers
Peruvian footballers
Peru international footballers
Footballers at the 1960 Summer Olympics
Olympic footballers of Peru
1970 FIFA World Cup players
Sporting Cristal footballers
A.C. Milan players
Cagliari Calcio players
Sociedade Esportiva Palmeiras players
Peruvian football managers
Sporting Cristal managers
Expatriate footballers in Brazil
Expatriate footballers in Italy
Peruvian Primera División players
Serie A players
Peruvian expatriate footballers
Peruvian expatriate sportspeople in Brazil
Peruvian expatriate sportspeople in Italy
Mariscal Sucre players
Coronel Bolognesi managers